The following is a list of automobiles manufactured by the defunct DeSoto division of the Chrysler Corporation, indexed chronologically by year of introduction.

Models
 DeSoto Series K-SA (1929–1932)
 Desoto Series SC-SD (1933–1934)
 DeSoto Airflow (1934–1936)
 DeSoto Airstream (1935–1936)
 DeSoto Series S (1937–1942) (S-1 through S-10, except the Airstream and Airflow)
 DeSoto Custom (1946–1952)
 DeSoto Deluxe (1946–1952)
 DeSoto Diplomat (1946-1961)
 DeSoto Firedome (1952–1959)
 DeSoto Powermaster (1953–1954)
 DeSoto Fireflite (1955–1960)
 DeSoto Adventurer (1956–1960)
 DeSoto Firesweep (1957–1959)

See also
 DeSoto
 List of automobiles

DeSoto vehicles
DeSoto